Adrian Macéus, (born May 3, 2005) is a Swedish artist and actor.

Biography 
Adrian Macéus, born May 3, 2005, in Stockholm.

During the summer of 2016 Macéus was part of the ensemble of Parkteaterns play Trollflöjten 2.0 where he played one of Paminas little brothers. He had the lead role in the musical Billy Elliot in 2018 at Stockholms stadsteater. Preparing for the role he trained for dance at Base 23 - Stockholm dance Academy. In 2018, he was part of the ensemble for the musical  Så som i himmelen at Oscarsteatern in Stockh olm, where he plays Gabriellas son.

He played Leo in the 2018 SVT Christmas calendar Storm på lugna gatan. He has also done dubbing acting, he dubbed the role of Miguel in the Swedish voice for the Pixar film Coco. Adrian did the Swedish voice as John Banks in Disneys Mary Poppins Returns.

in December 2018 Adrian Macéus released his debut single "How Are You Now" at Warner Music Sweden and Northbound Music Group that he himself written along with Kian Sang and Karl Ivert. He performed the song live in Bingolotto in TV4 on December 2, 2018 and became the third most popular artist that season.

Since 2019 he is the youngest ambassador representing the Swedish Anti Bullying foundation Friends. Adrian has chosen to use his platform to reach out and support children and young people who have it tough today, and show how we all involve and can contribute to positive change.

Adrian Macéus makes a Swedish podcast targeting teenagers. Adrian & Klara — Tonårsliv published at Spotify, Acast and YouTube.

During the autumn of 2020, Adrian Macéus entered a management cooperation with Maria Molin Ljunggren on Freebird Entertainment and Niklas Rune.

In 2021, Adrian Macéus features the main character Bert in TV4 and Cmore TV-series.

Awards and recognition 
Adrian Macéus was appointed in the autumn of 2020 as My local hero of the newspaper Mitt I and their readers.

In November 2020, Adrian Macéus received the price Årets Nätängel children & youth by Mysafety AB in collaboration with BRIS.

Family 
Adrian Macéus is the son of the program manager and producer Johan Macéus and the author and journalist Karolina Palutko Macéus.

References

Living people
2005 births
21st-century Swedish male actors
21st-century Swedish singers
21st-century Swedish male singers